Rolling is a village in the commune of Bous, in south-eastern Luxembourg.  , the village has a population of 106.

Remich (canton)
Villages in Luxembourg